Luxor Air was a charter airline based in Cairo, Egypt. It was privately owned and operated charter flights mainly to Europe. Its main base was Cairo International Airport.

References

External links

 

Defunct airlines of Egypt
Airlines established in 1999
Airlines disestablished in 2008
2008 disestablishments in Egypt
Egyptian companies established in 1999